Ernest Freeberg is an American historian in 19th and 20th-century American culture, currently a Distinguished Humanities Professor and Departmental Chair of History at the University of Tennessee. He was previously the Lindsay Young Professor and then Beaman Professor. In 2002, he was awarded the John H. Dunning Prize.

Bibliography
 The Education of Laura Bridgman: First Deaf and Blind Person to Learn Language (2002)
 Democracy's Prisoner (2008)
 The Age of Edison: Electric Light and the Invention of Modern America (2013)

References

Year of birth missing (living people)
Living people
University of Tennessee faculty
21st-century American historians
American male non-fiction writers
Emory University alumni
Middlebury College alumni
21st-century American male writers